Hashtnagri (Urdu: ہشتنگری) also spelled as Hashtnagri is a neighbourhood of Peshawar city in the Khyber Pakhtunkhwa province of Pakistan.

Overview  
Hashtnagri is located on both sides of Grand Trunk (GT) Road in Peshawar. The most notable attractions of Hashtnagri are Molvi Jee Hospital and City District Women Degree College, which is affiliated with Shaheed Benazir Bhutto Women University Peshawar.

Majority of the people living in Hashtnagri are Pakistanis but a sizeable population of Afghans also live here. Most are Muslims, with a small minority being Christians, Hindus and Sikhs. Major languages are Pashto, Urdu and Hindko.

Administrative Area 
Hashtnagri is part of Pakistan National Assembly seat NA- 31(Peshawar-1) while for KP Provincial Assembly it is part of Pk-78 (Peshawar-1).

See also 
 Faqeerabad
 Gulbahar Peshawar

References 

Populated places in Peshawar District